Carol Schmidt (born 25 June 1846, Bălți - died 9 March 1928, Chișinău) was an Imperial Russian politician in what is now Moldova. He was the longest serving mayor of Chișinău, being the mayor of the capital from 1877 by 1903, with a special contribution to the modernization of the city. He was a Bessarabian German and is considered one of the best mayors Chișinău ever had. He was the father of Alexander Schmidt, also mayor of Chișinău, between 1917-1918.

Biography 
Born in Bălți, in the family of Alexander Schmidt Senior, German Bessarabian, surgeon at the Medical Directorate of Bessarabia. Carol Schmidt's mother was of Polish origin. He was mentioned in the Russian documents as Карл Александрович Шмидт, transliterated Karl Alexandrovici Șmidt.

Career 

In 1857-1863 he studied at the Regional Gymnasium of Chișinău, in 1863-1864 he studied at the Faculty of Physics and Mathematics of St. Vladimir University in Kiev. In 1865 he was admitted at the Faculty of Law of the University of Odessa, which he graduated with the degree of doctor in legal sciences.

He becomes a candidate, then an assistant of the investigator from Bender (Tighina), then head of the investigation sector from Chișinău. Criminal investigator of the District Court of Chișinău (1870). Honorary peace judge of Chișinău District (1872-1908). Mayor of Chișinău (elected in 1877 and then, re-elected successively by 1901). In 1903, after the pogrom against the Jews, he resigned from the position of mayor.

"The pogrom against the Jews in Chișinău in April 1903 was the last drop that filled the glass and caused Carol Schmidt to resign. He, who had done so much for the europeanization of the city, could not conceive that here the inhabitants can have such a wild mentality. This was the reason for his resignation. A sensitive and cultured man like him was incompatible with the Black Hundreds that dictated the political fashion of the day. Another lesson could be given to the town citizens except the resignation ..."— Pantelimon V. Sinadino, "Our Chișinău" (Russian, Наш Кишинев), 1903-04.

Activity and reforms 
He contributed to the construction of the chapel in the Râșcani district and several houses for the people with disabilities (1877–81). With his contribution the streets were paved, an asylum was opened (1899), the popular Amphitheater with the performance space was built  (1900), the bust of Pushkin was unveiled, the first tram lines were opened (1881–95), the first aqueduct was built and the city's sewerage network, street lighting was introduced, numerous buildings were built (Royal School (1886), Princess Natalia Dadiani's Girls' Gymnasium (1900), County History Museum (1889), the current headquarters of the City Hall (1901), etc.).

He was a member of the Bessarabian Committee for the Protection of Orphanages, president of the Chisinau Directorate of the Young Students Aid Society, epitropist of the High School of Commerce and of the Royal School.

He initiated to open a museum of schools, of the Harmony Music Society and of the city school of Fine Arts (1894, today - the College of fine arts Alexandru Plămădeală).

The family 
He was married to Maria Cristi, the daughter of the landlord Ioan V. Cristi, ruler of the Bessarabian nobility and president of the governmental Zemstvo, and of Alexandra Nelidov (the her father was Alexandru Nelidov, a Bessarabian who became as ambassador of the Russian Empire to Constantinople). Carol Schmidt and Maria Cristi had 5 children, including Alexander (1879-1954), mayor of Chișinău in 1917-1918.

Schmidt and posterity 

Carol Schmidt was the only mayor to whom the citizens requested to be called in his behalf while he was still alive. It happened in 1902, when Schmidt was at 25 anniversary of being the mayor of the city. The former Gostinnaia street (Russian, Гостинная), on which Schmidt lived, became Carol Schmidt street (Russian, Шмидтовская). At present, one part of the street is called Mitropolit Varlaam street, and the other part is called Metropolitan Dosoftei. The house in which Carol Schmidt lived has survived until today and is located on Mitropolit Varlaam street no. 84 (at the intersection with Mihai Eminescu str.). A memorial plaque installed on that building reminds, in Romanian and German, of the former resident.

On 10 May 2014 the bust of Carol Schmidt was inaugurated in front of the National Philharmonic in Chișinău, near the house where the former mayor of Chișinău lived. All expenses were covered by the embassy of Germany and Poland. As for the mayor's grave, it is unknown. In 1937, a decade after Schmidt's death, Gheorghe Bezviconi wrote in the magazine From our past that the grave of the great mayor remains shabby and only a modest wooden cross is guarding him. After years, the wood rotting, the grave can no longer be identified.

References

Bibliography

 
 
 

1846 births
1928 deaths
People from Bălți
People from Beletsky Uyezd
Bessarabia-German people
Moldovan people of Polish descent
People from the Russian Empire of Polish descent
Mayors of Chișinău
Odesa University alumni